Nocardioides alpinus is a gram-positive, rod-shaped, psychrophilic and non-motile bacterium from the genus Nocardioides that has been isolated from cryoconite of an alpine glacier in the Ötztal Alps in Austria.

References

External links
Type strain of Nocardioides alpinus at BacDive -  the Bacterial Diversity Metadatabase	

alpinus
Bacteria described in 2012
Psychrophiles